Jan van Tilburg (16 June 1900 – 21 October 1977) was a Dutch politician for the Labour Party who was a member of the Senate between 1951 and 1955 and Governor of Suriname between 1956 and 1962. During his tenure in government, the Brokopondo Reservoir was created to supply electricity for the Suralco aluminium plant.

Biography 
Van Tilburg was born on 16 June 1900 in Rotterdam, Netherlands. He started to for work for the taxation office.

In 1945, van Tilburg became a councillor in Rotterdam, and started to work for the harbour. From 18 September 1951 until 28 December 1955, he was a member of the Senate. From 6 July 1954 until December 1955, he was a member of the Provincial States of South Holland.

On 11 February 1956, van Tilburg was appointed Governor-General of Suriname. During his tenure, the Brokopondo Reservoir was created to supply electricity for the Suralco aluminium plant. He served until 18 March 1962, and returned to Rotterdam.

In Rotterdam, van Tilburg was president of the Scheepvaart Vereeniging Zuid until 1967. He died on 21 October 1977, at the age of 77.

Honours 
  Commander in the Order of the Netherlands Lion.
  Knight in the Order of Orange Nassau.
  Commander in the Order of the Dannebrog.
  Commander in the Order of the Black Star.

References

1900 births
1977 deaths
Members of the Senate (Netherlands)
Governors of Suriname
Members of the Provincial Council of South Holland
Labour Party (Netherlands) politicians
Free-thinking Democratic League politicians
Aldermen of Rotterdam
Municipal councillors of Rotterdam
Dutch resistance members
Knights of the Order of Orange-Nassau
Commanders of the Order of the Dannebrog